ALM Antillean Airlines was the main airline of the Netherlands Antilles between its foundation in 1964 and its shut-down in 2001, operating out of Aruba, Bonaire, and Curaçao.

History 
ALM Antillean Airlines stood for "Antilliaanse Luchtvaart Maatschappij" and was founded on the 1st of August 1964 by the conversion of the KLM West-Indisch Bedrijf (West Indies Division) into ALM. ALM operated as a part of KLM Royal Dutch Airlines. KLM wanted to make Curaçao the hub for their American operations, and to provide an American link between the Far East and Europe. KLM did this with the flight of the Snip. ALM started out with three Convair 340s and served seven destinations. In addition to the airline business, ALM also provided catering and airline servicing for other companies using the Curaçao and Aruba airports. Its main destinations were Aruba, Bonaire, St Maarten, St Kitts, Maracaibo, Barranquilla and Caracas. Due to the surge in tourism, ALM quickly grew,and the Convairs were replaced by two Douglas DC-9-15s jets (ex KLM) and two brand new turboprop Fokker F27-500 series. New destinations were added, and an ex Viasa DC-9 was also added to the fleet.

The period between 1968 and 1969 was crucial for ALM. As of the 1st January 1969 the Antillean government took a 96% share over from the KLM and ALM became a state-owned company. To further make use of the booming tourist industry a Douglas DC-8 jet (from KLM) was chartered. Now ALM was able to fly directly to New York and Miami. Later on Panama and Costa Rica was added as ALM destinations. The New York to St Maarten route (1970 to 1973) was flown with a chartered Boeing 727-100 provided by Braniff International Airlines and also at one point with an Overseas National Airways (ONA) McDonnell Douglas DC-9-30.

The Fokker F-27s were replaced by a third DC-9-15 also from KLM and ALM became an all-jet passenger airline for a short time. During this time (Aug 1972) a Douglas DC-6B was purchased for the cargo routes. Windward Islands' WINAIR was acquired, with its fleet of turboprop, STOL capable de Havilland Canada DHC-6 Twin Otter (series 300 aircraft), by the Antillean government. It became apparent that on the short flights to Aruba and Bonaire the DC-9 jet was not cost effective. A temporary solution was found in the shape of two Twin Otter 100 series. For a while, ALM Twin Otter flights between Aruba-Bonaire-Curaçao were labeled ABC Commuter. After a bumpy start the Twin Otter became a success with the passengers and two further machines (series 300) were added. In the years 1973 through 1978, ALM made a total profit of ANG14.3M. Their raison d'être was to maintain airways between the islands of the Netherlands Antilles, and to promote tourist trade by providing transport.

During 1975 ALM replaced its older DC-9s with brand new McDonnell Douglas DC-9-32 series. This increased seating capacity significantly. Two years later a Boeing 727 was added for additional routes to Chicago, Cleveland, Detroit and New York, which were mostly operated as charter flights. During this period ALM grew rapidly and its number of personnel doubled in 1977. A year later a bi-lateral agreement between the Antillean government and the US was reached whereby ALM was allowed to take over the routes from KLM to the USA. To cope with the demand two Douglas DC-8-53 jets were leased from Rosenbalm Aviation. Additionally the Twin Otters were replaced by Short SD-330 commuter turboprop aircraft. In 1978, KLM restarted extensive cooperation with ALM. Two DC-8's were brought into the fleet and served the route Curaçao-New York JFK, where KLM handled the ground services. KLM was still hoping and trying to build a hub with ALM. KLM flights Curaçao-Amsterdam often had at least an ALM cabin crew on board in those years.1979 was a turning point for ALM. Due to the low point of the oil prices coupled with slow tourist figures and the devaluation of the Venezuelan currency, brought ALM into trouble. Additionally ALM had to deal with competing business from Eastern Airlines and American Airlines on competing routes. The DC-8 flights were halted and the newly arrived Short 330s were sold off. During 1980 the Boeing 727 and Beech Queen Air left the company and ALM concentrated on its fleet of four DC-9-32s.

During 1982 ALM decided to replace some of its DC-9s with two McDonnell Douglas MD-80 jetliners, which were leased from Curaçao Aircraft Leasing Company. A third example was later purchased from Continental Airlines. With business slowly improving, ALM was able to purchase additional airplanes which included the purchase of two elderly Fairchild Hiller FH-227B turboprops from Delta Air Transport for the short haul routes.

Due to the separate status of the Island of Aruba (1988) ALM had to contend with another competitor concerning the Aruba service:  Air Aruba which was operating two NAMC YS-11 turboprop aircraft on flights to Curaçao Hato International Airport. By early 1989 ALM was only serving thirteen destinations within the Caribbean basin and also Miami and New York. Although a price war was started between Air Aruba and ALM, this didn't last for long. In a few years, the prices for tickets between the three ABC-islands went back to their original levels or even higher. With the sharing of passengers between two competitors, profits on the Aruba-Curaçao route dwindled. Even worse was that the Miami-Curaçao route was also shared. The Miami-Curaçao route was considered one of ALM's most profitable routes. From 1970 through 1982, ALM's average loss was ANG 1.2 million per year or a total of 15.6M. As 1973-1978 showed a profit, in the remaining years the average loss was ANG 4.3 million, and probably heavier in the period after 1978.

During the 1990s ALM managed to stay in business despite stiff US competition and political changes in the aviation industry. de Havilland Canada DHC-8 Dash 8 regional turboprop aircraft were added to the fleet.  Early 1991 KLM re-invested into ALM with some minor shares. But due to lack of government and public interest, ALM could not keep up and slowly went into a dire financial situation. By the year 2000, things were so bad that ALM was on the verge of bankruptcy. KLM had stopped its participation with ALM concerning the Amsterdam-Curaçao flights. Worse for ALM, the KLM flights to Europe and South America now were transferred to Bonaire Flamingo International Airport, leaving the just opened ALM catering building at Curaçao Hato airport unused. ALM went into bankruptcy by early September 2001. ALM was replaced by DCA an all new company using the older DC-9-32s. ALM's headquarters were located in Willemstad, Curaçao. Before ceasing operations in 2001, ALM was based at Hato International Airport.

Destinations
ALM previously served the following destinations during its existence:

Fleet 
Over the years, ALM operated the following aircraft types:

Incidents and accidents 
 ALM Flight 980, operated via a wet lease by Overseas National Airways (ONA), was a scheduled flight from John F. Kennedy International Airport in New York to Princess Juliana International Airport on St. Maarten. On May 2, 1970, the DC-9-30 (U.S. registration N935F named the “Carib Queen”) operating the flight ran out of fuel after several unsuccessful landing attempts due to weather conditions, resulting in a water landing in the Caribbean Sea 48 km (30 mi) off St. Croix and the death of 23 of the 63 people on board.

References

http://landewers.net/PJ.txt (fleet info)

External links

 Air ALM (Archive)
 http://klmhistorie.forum2go.nl/de-antilliaanse-luchtvaart-maatschappij-als-klm-dochter-t149.html (ALM in Dutch)

 
Defunct airlines of the Netherlands Antilles
Defunct airlines of Curaçao
Airlines established in 1964
Airlines disestablished in 2001
1964 establishments in the Netherlands Antilles
2001 disestablishments in the Netherlands Antilles